Hexatoma brachycera is a species of limoniid crane flies in the family Limoniidae.

References

Limoniidae
Articles created by Qbugbot
Insects described in 1877